Akademicheskaya Dacha is a dacha (summer house) known as the oldest and major creative base of the Union of Artists of the Russian Federation. It is located near the town of Vyshny Volochyok in Tver Province, in a picturesque location on the banks of Msta River and Lake Mstino. In a broader sense, the Akademicheskaya Dacha (or "Akademichka") refers to the entire surrounding area including villages of Bolshoy Gorodok, Maliy Gorodok, Kisharino, Terpigorevo, Valentinovka and Podol, where many Russian artists resided in the mid-second half of the 20th century.

History 

The Akademicheskaya Dacha was opened on July 22, 1884, as a place of summer practice for poor students of the Imperial Academy of Arts. A plot of land with the park, house and buildings had been taken on lease by the Academy of Arts from the Ministry of Railways. It was originally named as "Vladimir and Maria shelter" in honor of Grand Duke Vladimir, president of the Imperial Academy of Arts, and his wife Grand Duchess Maria Pavlovna and the Empress Maria Alexandrovna. The exceptional role in Dacha's organization were the "Academic cottages" belonging to her guardian Vasily Kokorev, a major industrialist, and the owner of one of the largest collections of Russian and Western European art.

Before the October Revolution of 1917, many famous Russian artists worked on the Akademicheskaya Dacha, including Ilya Repin, Nikolay Bogdanov-Belsky, Pavel Chistyakov, Arkhip Kuindzhi, Isaac Levitan, Andrei Ryabushkin, Nicholas Roerich and Valentin Serov. After 1917 the house was given to the children for an open summer camp. Its artistic purpose was restored only in 1948. Since that time the Dacha has become one of the recognized centers of creative life in the Soviet Union and Russia. In those years here worked Russian painters Aleksei Gritsai, Vecheslav Zagonek, Dmitry Maevsky, Maya Kopitseva, Fyodor Reshetnikov, Nikolai Pozdneev, Nikolai Timkov, and many others. It is no accident, noting the role of the Akademicheskaya Dacha in preserving and promoting the traditions of Russian realistic Art, that it is called the "Russian Barbizon". The best art works of landscape and genre painting, exhibited in Art Shows of 1960s-1980s, were created primarily on the Dacha and its surroundings. Later in the 1970s-1980s, modern workshops and office buildings were built, providing year-round use of the Dacha for artistic purposes.

In 1964, the Akademicheskaya Dacha was named after the famous Russian painter Ilya Repin. In 1974, near the main pavilion a monument to Ilya Repin was erected, designed by sculptor Oleg Komov and architect Nikolai Komov, in honor of the 130th anniversary of the artist's birth. In 2004, during celebration of the 120th anniversary of the Akademicheskaya Dacha, a plaque in memory of Vasily Kokorev was open at the main pavilion building.

Academics 
Russian artists who worked at the Akademicheskaya Dacha and its surroundings since the end of the 19th century:

 Ilya Repin
 Nikolay Bogdanov-Belsky
 Isaak Brodsky
 Pavel Chistyakov
 Arkhip Kuindzhi
 Isaac Levitan
 Andrei Ryabushkin
 Nicholas Roerich
 Valentin Serov
 Sergey Gerasimov
 Aleksei Gritsai
 Maya Kopitseva
 Boris Lavrenko
 Dmitry Maevsky
 Samuil Nevelshtein
 Nikolai Pozdneev
 Nikolai Timkov
 Anatoli Vasiliev
 Boris Ugarov

See also
 List of Russian artists
 List of 20th-century Russian painters
 List of painters of Saint Petersburg Union of Artists
 List of the Russian Landscape painters
 Saint Petersburg Union of Artists
 Leningrad School of Painting

References

Bibliography 
 Романычева И. Академическая дача. Л., Художник РСФСР, 1975.
 Sergei V. Ivanov. Unknown Socialist Realism. The Leningrad School. Saint Petersburg, NP-Print Edition, 2007. PP.22–24, 40-41, 93, 98-99, 117-118, 194, 202, 223, 248, 261, 312, 335, 364, 377, 388.
 Романычева И. Академическая дача. История и традиции. СПб., Петрополь, 2009.
 Академическая дача. Каталог выставки. СПб., 2009.

External links 
 Bondareva N. The Academicheskaya Dacha. (Russian).

 
 
Soviet painters
Socialist realism
Socialist realist artists
1884 establishments in the Russian Empire
Cultural heritage monuments of federal significance in Tver Oblast